The men's discus throw event at the 2019 Summer Universiade was held on 11 and 13 July at the Stadio San Paolo in Naples.

Medalists

Results

Qualification
Qualification: 62.00  m (Q) or at least 12 best (q) qualified for the final.

Final

References

Discus
2019